Ron Milus (born November 25, 1963) is an American football coach who is the Defensive backs coach for the Indianapolis Colts of the National Football League (NFL). Milus has been a football coach in the National Football League (NFL) and was the defensive backs coach for the Los Angeles Chargers (2013-2020).

Playing career

Played four seasons for the Huskies as a cornerback and return specialist in from 1982-1985. He also coached at his alma mater winning a national championship.

References

Living people
Arizona Cardinals coaches
Carolina Panthers coaches
Denver Broncos coaches
Los Angeles Chargers coaches
Las Vegas Raiders coaches
New York Giants coaches
San Diego Chargers coaches
St. Louis Rams coaches
Washington Huskies football coaches
1963 births
Indianapolis Colts coaches